Avi Lubin; born 1977, is an Israeli curator of contemporary art. As of 2018, he is the curator of Hamidrasha Gallery. Lubin is also the co-founder and co-editor of Tohu Magazine, and the curator of Field Hospital X – Aya Ben Ron's work, which represented Israel at the 58th Venice Biennale, 2019.

Biography
Avi Lubin was born in 1977. He received his M.A. from Tel Aviv University in 2009.Since 2010, Lubin has curated exhibitions at the Tel Aviv Museum of Art, Apexart in New York, the Kosova National Art Gallery, Kunstverein KunstHaus Potsdam, Beit Uri and Rami Nehoshtan in Ashdot Ya'akov, the National Gallery of Macedonia, and the Israeli Pavilion at the Venice Biennale.

Lubin has been teaching at HaMidrasha – Faculty of the Arts since 2013, first as the head of theory studies of the postgraduate program in fine arts and, since 2018, as the curator of Hamidrasha Gallery – Hayarkon 19, where he curated group exhibitions such as “Seven Rituals to Change the Mood” and “America” by The New Barbizon, as well as solo shows by various artists, including Jonas Mekas, David Reeb, Tamar Getter, Erkan Özgen, Dor Zlekha Levy, Raffi Lavie, Efrat Hakimi and Oree Holban.

Between 2013-2017 Lubin was a lecturer at the Technion – Israel Institute of Technology's curating program. He frequently gives lectures, workshops and seminars as a guest lecturer in different academic institutions around the world such as The School of Visual Arts in New-York, the Van Leer Jerusalem Institute, Potsdam University of Applied Studies, Germany, and Shenkar College of Engineering, Design and Art, as well as in art institutions and museums such as The Metropolitan Museum of Art, das Weisse Haus in Vienna, The National Gallery of Kosovo, Residency Unlimited, and Contexts International Festival for Ephemeral Art in Sokolowkso.

In 2015, Lubin co-founded Tohu Magazine together with curator Leah Abir. Tohu is a non-profit online art magazine registered in Israel (n. 580613073), and is published in three languages: Hebrew, Arabic and English.

In 2018 he was selected along with artist Aya Ben Ron, to represent Israel in the 58th Venice Biennale, 2019.

His partner is artist Tomer Sapir.

Curated exhibitions
As of 2022, all exhibitions listed that are not affiliated with the Hamidrasha Gallery were independently curated by Lubin.

Publications 
Lubin co-edited the 19th issue of Hamidrasha Journal: Art School.

 2005 - "Society's symbolic order and political trials: Toward sacrificing the self for the 'big other'". American Journal of Psychoanalysis, 65(4), 367-379. 
 2009 - From political action to depoliticizing politics: Hannah Arendt, Tali Fahima and the encounter between politics and Israeli criminal law. [Unpublished master's thesis]. Tel Aviv University.
 2017 - Nimrod, S. (trans.). "Perhaps it is no coincidence that the horse's tail is also used for making paintbrushes, a catalogue essay for Tamar Getter: Hēliotropion at the Mishkan Museum of Art, Ein Harod." Publication unknown.
 2018 - "White Noise, Black Silence, a catalogue essay for Guy Golddstein exhibition Once, a Beat, Second Heat at the Petach Tikva Museum of Art." Publication unknown.
 2018 - Foreword. In: Sapir, T. Research for the Full Crypto-Taxidermical Index (A. Lubin, Ed.). Unknown Publisher.
 2019 - "In focus: Aya Ben Ron, a conversation." EIKON, 106.

References

External links 
 Tohu Magazine
 Field Hospital X
 	Field Hospital X at The Biennale Channel
 The Civic Role of the Curators – a conversation at the Van Leer Jerusalem Institute

1977 births
Living people
Israeli curators